Judith Ann Pachciarz (born 1941) is the first deaf woman in America to obtain an M.D. and a Ph.D.

Early life and education 
Raised in Danville, Illinois, Pachciarz lost her hearing at the age of two, due to encephalomeningitis, an inflammation of the brain which caused  extensive nerve damage. From an early age she hoped to become a doctor. After graduating from high school, she went on to earn a Master of Science degree at the University of Illinois in 1965 and a Ph.D. in microbiology and immunology at St. Louis University in 1971. However, her deafness long proved a bar to her medical ambitions. It was not until 1979, at which time she was teaching veterinary science at the University of Kentucky, that  she was finally accepted by a medical school, the University of Louisville School of Medicine.

Career 
Following her graduation in 1983, Pachciarz was chief resident in pathology for five years. She has been a hospital pathologist at Charles R. Drew University of Medicine and Science in Los Angeles.

References 

1941 births
Living people
American pathologists
People from Danville, Illinois
Saint Louis University alumni
University of Kentucky faculty
American deaf people
Scientists with disabilities